Druzhba is a rural locality (a settlement) and the administrative center of Dmitriyevskoye Rural Settlement of Koshekhablsky District, Adygea, Russia. The population of this settlement was 736 as of 2018. There are 9 streets.

Geography 
Druzhba is located 12 km northwest of Koshekhabl (the district's administrative centre) by road. Chekhrak is the nearest rural locality.

References 

Rural localities in Koshekhablsky District